"" is the former national anthem of the Islamic Republic of Iran. It was composed by Abolghasem Halat and was adopted after the establishment of the Islamic Republic, replacing the de facto national anthem Ey Iran which was used prior to that during the transition period. It was replaced in 1990 with the current national anthem of Iran.

Lyrics

References

External links
 Abolghasem Halat Biography  - Persian
 MIDI file

Historical national anthems
National symbols of Iran
National anthem compositions in F major
Government of the Islamic Republic of Iran
Iranian patriotic songs